Ronika K. Power is an Australian archaeologist who is a Professor of Bioarchaeology in the Department of History and Archaeology and Director of the Centre for Ancient Cultural Heritage and Environment at Macquarie University. Power is a Fellow of the Society of Antiquaries of London and the Royal Society of New South Wales.

Early life and education 
Power became interested in mummies as a child. She became ill with glandular fever and missed her high school leaving exams. She was left with chronic fatigue syndrome and remained unwell for eight years. Power was an undergraduate student at Macquarie University, where she studied ancient history. She graduated with the University Medal. After graduating Power moved to the United Kingdom, where she completed a master's degree in Palaeography at the University of Bradford. Power returned to Australia, where she completed her doctoral research in egyptology at Macquarie University. Her doctorate evaluated burials in the early Dynastic period. She was a postdoctoral fellow at the McDonald Institute for Archaeological Research.

Research and career 
Power worked as a European Research Council postdoctoral researcher at the University of Cambridge. As part of this work, she looked to understand the nature of connectivity in the Trans-Saharan zone. In 2014, she started working on the ERC Fragility and Sustainability in the restricted island environments of Malta (FRAGSUS) project, which studied why certain cultures maintained civilisations for centuries whilst other collapsed more quickly. FRAGSUS was the outcome of a long-term collaboration between the University of Malta and the University of Cambridge, largely driven by Caroline Malone. Power worked with the British Museum to develop Egyptian Mummies: Exploring Ancient Lives, an exhibition that ran from 2016 to 2017.

In 2016, Power returned to Macquarie University, where she was made a lecturer in bioarchaeology. Her research considers ancient human remains to better understand human health and migration. She studied the fossilised skeletons of a massacre that occurred 10,000 years ago in Lake Turkana. This study was named by Archaeology as one of the Top Ten Discoveries of 2016. Alongside her research, Power taught courses on the archaeology of death and burial. She delivered a TED talk at TEDxMelbourne in 2019.

Awards and honours 
 2018 Elected Fellow of the Society of Antiquaries of London
 2018 Appointed a Superstar of STEM
 2019 Elected Fellow of the Royal Society of New South Wales
 2019 Australian Academy of the Humanities Max Crawford Medal 
 2019 Union Académique Internationale Kwang-su Lim Early Career Award
 2019 Australian Institute of Policy in Science Tall Poppy Award

Selected publications

References 

Living people
Macquarie University alumni
Alumni of the University of Bradford
Academic staff of Macquarie University
Bioarchaeologists
21st-century Australian scientists
Australian women archaeologists
Year of birth missing (living people)